Baekhyun (stylized in all caps) is the first Japanese extended play by South Korean singer Baekhyun. It was released on January 20, 2021, by SM Entertainment and Avex Trax. The album features six tracks, including the lead single "Get You Alone".

Background and release 
Baekhyun debuted as a solo artist in July 2019, with City Lights, and has since released two extended plays in South Korea, both of which were commercially successful domestically and internationally. His second extended play, Delight sold over 1,000,000 copies, making it the first South Korean soloist album to do so in 19 years, and one of the best-selling albums in South Korea. 

On November 10, 2020, Baekhyun announced his Japanese debut through a short video message which was uploaded to Exo's official Japanese Twitter account. Following the announcement, Avex revealed the album covers and tracklist. The album was released in a total of six editions: five CDs and one CD+DVD. Pre-orders for the first press limited edition began on the same day. The music video for lead single "Get You Alone" premiered on Baekhyun's concert Baekhyun: Light on January 3, 2021. The next day, the single was released along with its music video.

Live performance  
On January 3, 2021, before the album's and the title track's release, Baekhyun performed "Get You Alone" on his solo concert for the first time.

Track listing 
Adapted from Exo's official website.

DVD 

 Get You Alone -Music Video-
 Off Shot Movie

Charts

Weekly charts

Monthly charts

Year-end charts

Certifications and sales

Release history

References 

Baekhyun albums
Japanese-language EPs
Avex Trax albums
SM Entertainment EPs